Madeline Provenzano (1936–2014) was a member of the New York City Council from the Bronx. A Democrat and former chief-of-staff to her predecessor, Councilman Michael DeMarco, Provenzano was first elected in 1997, representing District 13.  She was re-elected in 2001 and again in 2003 (after Council boundaries were redrawn). In 2005, Provenzano was barred from seeking another term by New York City's term limits law (which were amended in 2009).

References

External links
 Our Campaigns: Madeline Provenzano
 East Bronx stalwart politician Madeline Provenzano dies at 78 

New York City Council members
New York (state) Democrats
Living people
1936 births
Women New York City Council members
Politicians from the Bronx
21st-century American women